Arcadia is a city in northeast Crawford County, Kansas, United States.  As of the 2020 census, the population of the city was 254.

History
Arcadia was founded in 1862. It was named for the ancient region of Arcadia, in Greece.

The first post office in Arcadia was established in June, 1867.

Arcadia was a station on the St. Louis–San Francisco Railway.

Geography
The east edge of Arcadia is the Kansas-Missouri state border.

Demographics

2010 census
As of the census of 2010, there were 310 people, 136 households, and 79 families living in the city. The racial makeup of the city was 91.9% White, 1.3% African American, 1.0% Native American, 1.6% from other races, and 4.2% from two or more races. Hispanic or Latino of any race were 3.2% of the population.

There were 136 households, of which 30.9% had children under the age of 18 living with them, 40.4% were married couples living together, 13.2% had a female householder with no husband present, 4.4% had a male householder with no wife present, and 41.9% were non-families. 34.6% of all households were made up of individuals, and 10.3% had someone living alone who was 65 years of age or older. The average household size was 2.28 and the average family size was 2.95.

The median age in the city was 42.2 years. 24.8% of residents were under the age of 18; 6.1% were between the ages of 18 and 24; 23.5% were from 25 to 44; 31.3% were from 45 to 64; and 14.2% were 65 years of age or older. The gender makeup of the city was 50.3% male and 49.7% female.

2000 census
As of the census of 2000, there were 391 people, 156 households, and 105 families living in the city. The racial makeup of the city was 96.16% White, 0.51% African American, 1.28% Native American, 1.02% from other races, and 1.02% from two or more races. Hispanic or Latino of any race were 0.26% of the population.

There were 156 households, out of which 35.9% had children under the age of 18 living with them, 45.5% were married couples living together, 15.4% had a female householder with no husband present, and 32.1% were non-families. 28.2% of all households were made up of individuals, and 13.5% had someone living alone who was 65 years of age or older. The average household size was 2.51 and the average family size was 3.08.

In the city, the population was spread out, with 27.9% under the age of 18, 11.0% from 18 to 24, 27.1% from 25 to 44, 20.7% from 45 to 64, and 13.3% who were 65 years of age or older. The median age was 34 years. For every 100 females, there were 91.7 males. For every 100 females age 18 and over, there were 95.8 males.

The median income for a household in the city was $21,750, and the median income for a family was $27,386. Males had a median income of $22,500 versus $17,321 for females. The per capita income for the city was $10,674. About 17.2% of families and 24.2% of the population were below the poverty line, including 31.2% of those under age 18 and 11.5% of those age 65 or over.

References

External links
 Arcadia - Directory of Public Officials
 USD 246, local school district
 Arcadia city map, KDOT

Cities in Kansas
Cities in Crawford County, Kansas
1862 establishments in Kansas